James Brewster may refer to:

James C. Brewster (1826–1909), co-founder of the Church of Christ (Brewsterite)
Jim Brewster (born  1947), Democratic member of the Pennsylvania Senate since 2010
Wally Brewster (James Walter Brewster Jr., born 1960), U.S. diplomat and ambassador to the Dominican Republic, 2013–2017
James Brewster (1777–1847), British minister, brother of David Brewster